Jason Quigley is an Australian rules football field umpire in the Australian Football League. He has umpired 48 career games in the AFL.

Footnotes

Australian Football League umpires
Year of birth missing (living people)
Living people